Ben McKay (born 13 September 1982) is a British actor.

Early life
Ben McKay was born in Bristol, England on 13 September 1982.

He went to Pembroke School, South West Wales, where he studied Drama under Denise Schofield and Chris Harding.

Ben was more interested in work behind the scenes of the school plays, where he showed a flare for painting scenery and spray-painting art.

Career
McKay is the actor who is best known for his roles in a 2006 episode of Torchwood and the 2007 film Hot Fuzz.

Filmography

Television

Film

References

External links

1982 births
British male film actors
Living people
Male actors from Bristol
British male television actors